The Seduction of Claude Debussy is the fifth and final studio album by Art of Noise, released in June 1999 in the United Kingdom and the United States, and December 1999 in Japan. It features a line-up of Trevor Horn, Anne Dudley, Paul Morley and Lol Creme, along with other appearances from John Hurt, soprano Sally Bradshaw, Rakim, and Donna Lewis. As it had been 10 years since their last album, this album carries a completely different sound to that which had defined their four previous albums. The group blended the music of French impressionist composer Claude Debussy with drum and bass, opera, hip hop, jazz, and narration, to create a concept album which they described as "the soundtrack to a film that wasn't made about the life of Claude Debussy."

The album was announced in mid-1998 as being due for release by the end of that year, but did not release until mid-1999. The album was only released on CD and MiniDisc formats. The UK edition was released 28 June 1999, while the US edition was released 29 June 1999. The Japan edition was released 1 December 1999.

Track listings

US edition
The first US edition of the album, released 29 June 1999, included a bonus disc with remixes of "Metaforce".

Japanese edition
The Japanese edition, released 1 December 1999, was a CD-Extra with two bonus tracks. Some tracks were presented in slightly different mixes.

The CD-ROM portion of the disc contained the "Metaforce" video in a QuickTime format.

The Production of Claude Debussy
A promotional version mixed by Trevor Horn, released several months in advance in the US, Canada, and UK, contained the same tracks in a slightly different sequence and with some mixing differences, with "Born on a Sunday" and with "Dreaming in Colour" being one continuous track instead of split into two.

This version, retitled The Production of Claude Debussy and described as a "producer's cut", was included on the 2015 compilation Art of Noise At the End of A Century. It was given a stand-alone digital release in 2022.

Related compilations

Reduction
Reduction, released in 2000, was a limited edition album consisting mainly of outtakes from The Seduction of Claude Debussy. It was available as a separate item in some regions, while in others it was released as a 2-disc set with the original album.

An Extra Pulse of Beauty
From 24 June through 30 September 1999, people who purchased the US edition of The Seduction of Claude Debussy from certain vendors received, by email, a code which could be used to order a custom CD-R containing 5 to 12 (initially, 5 to 10) previously unreleased tracks from the group's early years, with one of three titles, each with its own cover art: Bashful, Belief System, or An Extra Pulse of Beauty. The compilation was released digitally under the latter title.

Personnel
Featured artists
 Anne Dudley – Keyboards, Orchestral Arrangement, Voice, Piano
 Trevor Horn – Bass, Voice, Keyboards
 Paul Morley – Keyboards, Voice
 Lol Creme – Guitar, Keyboards, Voice

Guest Personnel
 John Hurt – Narrator
 Sally Bradshaw – Vocals (tracks: 1 to 5, 8 to 13)
 Jamie Muhoberac – Keyboards (tracks: 1, 3, 5, 6, 8)
 Rakim – Vocals (tracks: 6, 7, 10)
 Donna Lewis – Vocals (tracks: 3, 5)

Chart positions
The album reached No.150 on the UK Albums Chart on 7 October 1999. The "Metaforce" single (ZTT 129 CD) reached No.53 on the UK Singles Chart on 26 June 1999.

References

External links

 with album credits

Art of Noise albums
1999 albums
Concept albums
ZTT Records albums
Universal Records albums
Albums produced by Trevor Horn